The Val Medel is a righthand side valley of the Surselva valley in Graubünden, Switzerland. There is a road through the valley and over Lukmanier Pass into Ticino.

The lower  of the valley contains a narrow gorge, known as the Medelserschluch or Las Ruinas, which widens to the green and fertile Trog valley at the village of Curaglia.

Settlements
The only municipality in the valley is Medel, which encompasses the numerous villages, hamlets and isolated settlements on both sides of the valley. The largest and most northerly village is Curaglia. Other settlements are (from north to south) Mutschnengia, Platta, Pardes, and Fuorns Acla.

Language and religion
An intermediate form between the Disentis and Tujetsch dialects of the Sursilvan language is spoken in the Val Medel. The vast majority of the population is Catholic.

Waters
The river Froda flows through the uppermost portion of the valley. It begins in the Lai da Sontga Maria reservoir. At the hamlet of  Pardatsch, the Froda merges with the Rein da Cristallina (which emerges from the Val Cristallina), to form the Rein da Medel, which flows into the Anterior Rhine at Disentis. Many small tributaries flow into Rein da Medel from both sides.

Side Valleys
At Curaglia the Val Plattas branches off to the south east. Near Pardatsch, the Val Cristallina branchess off, also to the south east.

Gallery

External links

Official website of the municipality
Val Medel

Valleys of Switzerland
Valleys of Graubünden